Aden, then South Arabia, competed twice in the Commonwealth Games; in 1962 as Aden, and in 1966 as South Arabia.

In 1967 the Federation of South Arabia left the Commonwealth, becoming part of the People's Republic of South Yemen, and in 1990 part of the Republic of Yemen.

1962, Perth 

The Colony of Aden sent a team to the 1962 British Empire and Commonwealth Games at Perth, Australia but did not win any medals.

The Aden Team captain was policeman Nasser Ahmed Salem, aged 29 and a father of seven. Other team members were David Griffiths was a second lieutenant in the King's Own Scottish Borderers who ran the half-mile and mile, who two months before had led one of two platoons which battled ten thousand rioters in Aden.

1966, Jamaica

The Federation of South Arabia sent a team to the 1966 British Empire and Commonwealth Games at Kingston, Jamaica but did not win any medals.  The team consisted of Yassin Abdi (who competed in the 100 yards and 200 yards races), Mohamed Ismail (who entered the 1 mile race, but did not start, and competed in the 3 miles race) and R Tolliday (a wrestler in the 62 kg freestyle wrestling).

References
The Commonwealth Games: The First 60 Years 1930-1990 by Cleve Dheensaw (1994, Hodder & Stoughton, Canada/New Zealand)  

Nations at the Commonwealth Games
Sport in Yemen
20th century in the Colony of Aden
Federation of South Arabia
Yemen at multi-sport events
1962 in Asia
1962 in the British Empire
1966 in Asia
1966 in the British Empire